Kharvas is a 2018 Indian Marathi-language short drama film directed by Aditya Suhas Jambhale and written by Smita Jambhale. The film stars Veena Jamkar, Sandesh Kulkarni, and Swati Bowalekar and recounts the story of a woman who faces physical and emotional challenges after having delivered a stillborn child. In 2018, the film was selected to be screened at International Film Festival of India which was held in Panaji on 20 November 2018. In 2019, the film won the National Film Awards for Best Short Fiction Film.

Plot 
The film is 38 minutes long produced by Shubhang Borkar, that follows Asawari (Veena Jamkar) who has lost her baby in a stillbirth and is going through physical, emotional, and societal ramifications of the tragedy. She quits her painting career and starts back to her ancestral home in a remote Konkan village to overcome her trauma.

Screening 
The film was selected as the opening non feature film at the Indian Panorama, at 49th International Film Festival of India (IFFI) and was awarded the National Film Award for Best Short Fiction Film in 2019.

Reception 
Suparna Thombare of Cinestaan wrote "The screenplay, though, is tight and poignant, aided by Jamkar's dramatic performance. A well-shot climax packs in all the action, becoming a great lead-in to a hopeful conclusion — life goes on and the smiles will be back, but the process of grieving is equally important."

Accolades

References

External links 
 

2018 films
2010s Marathi-language films
Indian drama films
Indian short films
Films about women in India
2018 drama films
2018 short films